
This is a list of aircraft in alphabetical order beginning with 'Tw'.

Tw

Twining 
(H la V Twining, Los Angeles, CA)
 Twining 1910 Ornithopter

References

Further reading

External links 

 List of aircraft (T)